Constantin Schumacher (born 8 May 1976) is a Romanian football manager and former midfielder. Previously, he also main coached Rapid București between 2017 and 2018.

Club career
Constantin Schumacher started his football career at CSȘ Fălticeni, a youth club in his neighbourhood. He signed in 1992 with Foresta Fălticeni but moved, after only a season, to another Liga II team, more specifically FC Argeş Piteşti. At the end of the season, his team promoted and he played 5 seasons for Argeș in Liga 1. 

In 2000, he joined Rapid Bucharest where he played four seasons, making 77 appearances for his team and scoring 12 goals. After his time as a player at Rapid Bucharest, he moved to China, signing with Chongqing Qiche. He played two years in China, before moving back to Romania, where he played at Universitatea Craiova. 

At the end of the season, his team relegated and he moved to Ukraine at Volyn Lutsk. He played 17 games in Vyscha Liha, scoring a goal. He returned to Romania after only a season at FC Argeş Piteşti. At the end of 2006–2007 season, Argeș relegated and he moved at Ceahlăul Piatra Neamţ.

International career
Schumacher has also one cap for Romania. He played against Croatia at Dan Păltinişanu, but after that game he was not called anymore.

Honours

Player
Argeș Pitești
Divizia B: 1993–94

Rapid București
Divizia A: 2002–03
Cupa României: 2001–02
Supercupa României: 1999, 2002

Coach
Rapid București
Liga IV – Bucharest: 2017–18

References

External links

1976 births
Living people
People from Fălticeni
Romanian people of German descent
Romanian footballers
Romania international footballers
Association football midfielders
Liga I players
Liga II players
FC Argeș Pitești players
FC Rapid București players
ACF Gloria Bistrița players
FC U Craiova 1948 players
CSM Ceahlăul Piatra Neamț players
FC Internațional Curtea de Argeș players
China League One players
Chongqing Liangjiang Athletic F.C. players
Guangzhou F.C. players
Ukrainian Premier League players
FC Volyn Lutsk players
Football League (Greece) players
Anagennisi Giannitsa F.C. players
Romanian expatriate footballers
Romanian expatriate sportspeople in China
Expatriate footballers in China
Romanian expatriate sportspeople in Ukraine
Expatriate footballers in Ukraine
Romanian expatriate sportspeople in Greece
Expatriate footballers in Greece
Romanian football managers
ASC Daco-Getica București managers
FC Argeș Pitești managers
FC Petrolul Ploiești managers
FC Rapid București managers